John Musa (6 March 1950) is a Zimbabwean cyclist. He competed in the sprint and the 1000m time trial events at the 1980 Summer Olympics.

References

External links
 

1950 births
Living people
Zimbabwean male cyclists
Olympic cyclists of Zimbabwe
Cyclists at the 1980 Summer Olympics
Place of birth missing (living people)